Sedgwick station may refer to:

 Sedgwick station (CTA), Chicago, U.S.
 Sedgwick station (SEPTA), Philadelphia, U.S.